John Kevin Alipate Ahio (born 20 July 1990), known professionally as Hemi Ahio, is a New Zealand born Tongan professional boxer.

He is the current WBC Middle East Heavyweight title. Ahio has peaked in the WBC with him reaching 25th in the Bridgerweight division in May 2021, and 35th in the Heavyweight division in January 2022.

He is the a two time New Zealand national Heavyweight champions, being the first person to hold two New Zealand heavyweight titles from two commissioning bodies including NZNBF and PBCNZ. He is the first IBO Oceania-Oriental Heavyweight champion.

Early life and inspirations 
Ahio was born and raised in Auckland, New Zealand by Tongan parents. He was introduced to boxing in 2012 by his uncle, after Ahio was attacked and stabbed by a group of men while waiting for a bus. Due to his height and ferocity he has been compared to a young Mike Tyson, sometimes earning him the nickname the 'Tongan Tyson'. He was inspired by New Zealand Samoan Heavyweight David Tua, and Tongan Legend Kitone Lave.

Professional boxing

Professional debut to New Zealand champion 2013–2017 
Ahio made his professional boxing debut in 2013 where he stopped Clint Foai in the first round. At this time Ahio was trained by Lolo Heimuli. Ahio made his professional boxing debut in June 2014 when he defeated Will Quarrie by unanimous decision on the undercard of the inaugural Super 8 Boxing Tournament. Around this time is where Hemi Ahio signed a long-term deal with John McRae, promoter of the Super 8 tournament series.

Ahio next broadcast fight is on the third Super 8 event undercard in 2015 where he took on the American Clarence Tillman. Ahio would win the fight with Tillman retiring in corner from Shoulder dislocation. Ahio would fight again in May 2015 against journeyman Junior Maletino Iakopo. Ahio won the fight by Unanimous Decision, fighting through the fight with a hand injury. In August 2015, Ahio had his first international fight, in Australia, on a Danny Green undercard against Andre Meunier. Ahio won the first by first-round knockout. Ahio would return to the Super 8 events on TV when he takes on American Samoan boxer Alapati A'asa for the vacant New Zealand National (NZNBF version) Heavyweight title to end his 2015. After both boxers gets knocked down during the fight, Ahio won the fight by second-round TKO, picking up hist first title.

Due to his promoter losing major sponsors earlier in the year, Ahio was not able to keep active. Ahio wasn't able to fight on other cards due to contract obligations to the former promoter. The contract however expired in 2018. Ahio would make his return in 2017 where he took on Daniel Tai for the vacant IBO Oceania Orient Heavyweight title and vacant New Zealand National (PBCNZ version) Heavyweight title. This will be the last fight Ahio would be fight under his trainer Lolo Heimuli and his promoter John McRae. Ahio would win the fight by unanimous decision picking up his second and third titles.

Fighting around the world, regional champion 2018–present 
In November 2018, Ahio made his in ring return with a new trainer and away from the old promoter. Alongside Junior Fa, Hemi Ahio started training at City Kickboxing under Eugene Bareman and Doug Viney. Mark Keddell who has been Ahio regular matchmaker since 2015, has now became his co-manager. Ahio would make his American debut in March 2019 where he took on Ed Fountain. Ahio would win the fight by seventh round stoppage. At the end of March 2019, Ahio took on American boxer and the tallest boxer in the world Julius Long on the Geovana Peres vs Lani Daniels WBO World Light Heavyweight title fight undercard. Ahio won the fight by unanimous decision. Ahio will continue to have more fights overseas, making his Middle East Debut when he fought undefeated Ali Kiydin in July 2019. Hemi Ahio won the fight by first-round knockout. Ahio returned to America when he fought American Joshua Tufte. Ahio won the fight by second round stoppage.

Due to the Covid Pandemic,  Ahio was not was not able to fight in 2020. During 2021, he was able to secure a WBC ranking in the Bridgerweight division, reaching 25th on the Bridgerweight rankings. In February 2021, Ahio fought in a rematch against Julius Long. Ahio won the fight by seventh-round knockout. In October 2021, Ahio fought in the Middle East for the second time, taking on Mohammad Ali Bayat Farid for the inaugural WBC Middle East Heavyweight title. Ahio won the fight by second-round TKO picking up his first major international title. In his time away from the ring, Ahio would peak on the WBC rankings in the heavyweight division reaching 35th. Ahio returned to the ring in June 2022. Orginnally his opponent was scheduled to be Joe Jones, however due to a last minute pull out, Ahio took on Christian Ndzie Tsoye. Ahio won the fight by stoppage as his opponent retired in the corner between rounds due to injury.

Kickboxing 
On December 23, 2016, Ahio fought in his one and only kickboxing fight under the name of John Kevin in Emei, China. Ahio took on experienced kickboxer Julius Mocka in the 100 kg+ division at EM Legend event "EM Legend 15 - End of Year Finals Emei" at Emei Shan Gymnasium. Ahio lost the fight by first round knockout.

Professional boxing titles 
 New Zealand National Boxing Federation
 New Zealand National Heavyweight Title (2015)
 Professional Boxing Commission New Zealand
 New Zealand National Heavyweight Title (2017)
 International Boxing Organisation
 IBO Oceania-Oriental Heavyweight Title (2017)
 World Boxing Council
 WBC Middle East Heavyweight Title (2021)

Professional boxing record

Professional kickboxing record 

|-
|-  style="background:#FFBBBB"
| 2016-12-23 || Loss ||align=left| Julius Mocka || EM Legend 15 - End of Year Finals Emei || Emei, China || KO (Right High Leg) || 1 || 2:06 || 0-1
|-
| colspan=9 | Legend:

References

External links 

1990 births
Living people
New Zealand boxers
Tongan boxers
New Zealand sportspeople of Tongan descent
Heavyweight boxers
Bridgerweight boxers
New Zealand professional boxing champions